Asod may refer to:
Asod River, river in Romania
Asud, Mongol clan of Alani origin